Jamie Young (born June 14) is an American basketball coach. He is currently an assistant coach for the Philadelphia 76ers of the NBA.

Coaching career

Boston Celtics
Young was with the Celtics franchise from 2000 until 2021. He served as a video coordinator (2000–2007) and advance scout (2007–2011) for the Celtics before being hired as an assistant coach in 2011. Former Celtics head coach Doc Rivers praised Young for his "incredible work ethic" and "great basketball mind".

Philadelphia 76ers
In August 2021, the Philadelphia 76ers hired Young as an assistant coach.

Personal life
He is from Indiana. Young graduated from Blackburn College in 1998. He earned a bachelor's degree in physical education.

References 

Living people
Blackburn Beavers football players
Blackburn Beavers men's basketball players
Boston Celtics assistant coaches
Basketball coaches from Indiana
Philadelphia 76ers assistant coaches
American men's basketball players
Year of birth missing (living people)